Danny Trejo is an American actor. His filmography consists of about 250 film and television roles. His prominence in the B movie scene has resulted in disparate media sources referring to Trejo as an "iconic actor" and a "film legend", among other titles.

Trejo's film career began in 1985, when he "accidentally" landed a role in Runaway Train, playing a boxer for a daily fee of $320. Prior to that, Trejo had served time in prison on multiple occasions and worked as a drug counsellor after his release. Trejo credits the first film in which he was given a proper credited role as Art Sanella in Death Wish 4: The Crackdown. He went on to star in a multitude of other films, including Desperado, From Dusk till Dawn, Con Air, Reindeer Games, and Grindhouse, among others.

From 2001 to 2003, Trejo appeared in the Robert Rodriguez-directed Spy Kids franchise as Isador "Machete" Cortez, in the films Spy Kids, Spy Kids 2: The Island of Lost Dreams and Spy Kids 3-D: Game Over. He also voiced Uncle Machete in the video game Spy Kids: Mega Mission Zone. In 2007, Trejo reprised his role in a fictional trailer in Grindhouse, also directed by Rodriguez; subsequently, in 2010, Trejo reprised his role as Machete in a spin-off exploitation film of the same name as the protagonist, also directed by Rodriguez. The character is cited as his "first major film role". Subsequently, Trejo reprised his role as Machete in Spy Kids: All the Time in the World, with the success of Machete also resulting in a direct sequel, Machete Kills, with Trejo once again reprising his role. Trejo has been cast in many television programmes, including Baywatch, where he portrayed different characters for different episodes. Outside of film and television appearances, Trejo has also been featured in a handful of music videos, including the video for Dustin Tavella's "Everybody Knows (Douchebag)". He voiced the characters Umberto Robina for the video games Grand Theft Auto: Vice City and Grand Theft Auto: Vice City Stories, himself in Def Jam: Fight for NY (2004), Raul Alfonso Tejada in Fallout: New Vegas, Trainer Duke in The Fight: Lights Out, himself in Call of Duty: Black Ops and Call of The Dead and Call of Duty Black Ops 4: Blackout and also himself in Far Cry 6: Danny and Dani vs. Everybody and SCUM, among others.

Film

Television

TV commercials

Podcast series

Video games

Music videos

Soundtrack
Delta Farce (2007) (performer: "I Will Survive")
Muppets Most Wanted (2014) (performer: "End of the Road", "I Hope I Get It")

References

Male actor filmographies
American filmographies